Denmark took part in the Eurovision Song Contest for the first time at the Eurovision Song Contest 1957, held in Frankfurt, Germany. The Danish entry was chosen during a national final called .

The country was represented by Birthe Wilke and Gustav Winckler with the song "Skibet skal sejle i nat", written by Erik Fiehn and Poul Sørensen. Denmark had wanted to take part in the first Eurovision Song Contest in 1956 but withdrew because no entry was submitted before the deadline.

Before Eurovision

Dansk Melodi Grand Prix 1957 

 1957 was held in Copenhagen on 17 February 1957. The show was hosted by Volmer Sørensen. 117 songs had been submitted to the broadcaster and six of them were chosen for the national final. Two singers were competing in the selection - Birthe Wilke and Gustav Winckler. Both performed two songs as soloists and they also performed two songs as a duo. A jury of ten people selected the winner and only the top two were announced, which turned out to be the two duets. "Skibet skal sejle i nat" was the overall winner and would become Denmark's first entry in the Eurovision Song Contest.

Releases 
"" was recorded and released on an EP of the same title. The runner-up entry "" was included on this record too. After the contest, Gustav Winkler has recorded a German version of the song ("") with Bibi Johns. Winkler himself appeared as Gunnar Winkler on this record, the name under which he was popular in Germany in these days.

At Eurovision 
Denmark was the first Scandinavian country in the competition. At the Eurovision Song Contest in Frankfurt, the Danish entry was visually one of the most impressive ones that year: to illustrate the content of the song, which is about a sailor who has to say goodbye to a woman he met and fell in love with during a shore leave, Winkler was dressed up as a sailor and Wilke as a woman standing at the harbour wearing a coat with a purse in her hand. Furthermore, a tar vat was brought on stage to create a harbour atmosphere. Additionally, the song is famous for the kiss the duo exchanged at the end of the performance – the longest stage kiss in contest history, made so by a stagehand omitting to signal for it to end.

The Danish entry was performed ninth (2nd last) on the night following France and preceding Switzerland. At the close of voting, Denmark had received ten points in total placing the country third among the ten participants. Denmark would remain the most successful debuting country in the Eurovision Song Contest until Poland finished second on its debut in 1994. However, Denmark has only received points from three of the other nine countries, most notably five points from the Netherlands.

Voting 
Every country had a jury of ten people. Every jury member could give one point to his or her favourite song.

Sources 
The Danish final of esconnet.dk
Information about the national final

References 

1957
Countries in the Eurovision Song Contest 1957
Eurovision